Gretna is a town in Pittsylvania County, Virginia, United States. The population was 1,267 at the 2010 census. It is part of the Danville Metropolitan Statistical Area.

History
The Gretna Commercial Historic District and Yates Tavern are listed on the National Register of Historic Places. The Gretna High football program has produced some prolific teams and claims 5 AA state championships.

Geography
Gretna is located at  (36.953190, -79.362769).

Demographics

At the 2000 census there were 1,257 people, 569 households, and 326 families living in the town. The racial makeup of the town was 60.54% White, 38.90% African American, 0.08% Native American, 0.08% Asian, 0.16% from other races, and 0.24% from two or more races. Hispanic or Latino people of any race were 0.40%.

Of the 569 households 20.7% had children under the age of 18 living with them, 36.6% were married couples living together, 18.3% had a female householder with no husband present, and 42.7% were non-families. 40.4% of households were one person and 22.0% were one person aged 65 or older. The average household size was 2.06 and the average family size was 2.75.

The age distribution was 18.4% under the age of 18, 4.7% from 18 to 24, 21.7% from 25 to 44, 23.9% from 45 to 64, and 31.3% 65 or older. The median age was 50 years. For every 100 females there were 74.1 males. For every 100 females age 18 and over, there were 67.9 males.

The median household income was $23,710 and the median family income was $33,611. Males had a median income of $28,158 versus $20,598 for females. The per capita income for the town was $14,397. About 14.4% of families and 19.3% of the population were below the poverty line, including 27.7% of those under age 18 and 20.7% of those age 65 or over.

References

External links
Town website

Towns in Pittsylvania County, Virginia